Neocuphocera is a genus of parasitic flies in the family Tachinidae. There are at least two described species in Neocuphocera.

Species
These two species belong to the genus Neocuphocera:
 Neocuphocera nepos Townsend, 1927
 Neocuphocera orbitalis (Aldrich, 1929)

References

Further reading

 
 
 
 

Tachinidae
Articles created by Qbugbot